Slovo (A Word) is the sixth full-length album by the Russian pagan metal band Arkona. It was released on 26 August 2011 through Napalm Records. An academical choir and a chamber orchestra were used on the album.

Reception

A review by the webzine Jukebox Metal called the album "imaginative and lively" but criticised a lack in musical consistency and identity. Metal Hammer Germany was more positive and lauded the evolution in the band's musical quality, writing that the songs were more complex and sophisticated than those on the previous studio album Goi, Rode, Goi!.

Track listing

Personnel

Arkona
Masha "Scream" – vocals, keyboards, tambourine, khomus, shaman drums, shaker, choirs, acoustic guitar on Bol’no mne, producing, engineering, mixing
Sergei "Lazar" Atrashkevich – lead guitar, acoustic guitars, balalaika, additional vocals on Arkaim and Nikogda, producing, engineering, mixing, mastering
Ruslan "Kniaz" – bass
Vlad "Artist"  Lyovushkin Sokolov – drums and percussion, synthesizers
Vladimir "Volk" – gaita gallega, tin whistle, low whistle, sopilka, zhaleika, blockflute, hurdy-gurdy

Additional musicians
 Chamber Orchestra of Kazan State Conservatory N.G. Zhiganov (under the direction of Darya Ivanova)
 The choir of Moscow State Conservatory students (conducted by Alexandra Sidorova)
 Meri Tadić (Eluveitie) – violin
 Anna Kalinovskaya (Rodogost) – symbaly
 Tatiana Narishkina, Dariana Antipova (Vedan’ Kolod’) – vocals on "Zimushka"
 Ilya "Wolfenhirt" (Svarga), Aleksandr "Shmel" (Rarog) – choir on "Stenka na Stenku"
 Aleksandr Oleynikov (Kalevala) – accordion on "Stenka na Stenku"
 Ilya "Hurry" (Svarga) – accordion on "Leshiy"

References

2011 albums
Arkona (band) albums
Napalm Records albums